Bige Önal (born 1 February 1990) is a Turkish actress.

Önal was born on 1 February 1990 in Istanbul. Her father Erhan Önal was a former football player who played for Bayern Munich and Galatasaray. Her mother, Mine Baysan, is a former model. Her parents divorced when she was 9 years old. After graduating from Saint-Benoît French High School, she enrolled in Istanbul Bilgi University and finished her studies there.

Her first recognizable role was on youth series Elde Var Hayat in 2010, in which she portrayed the character of Yeliz. She was then cast in period series Benim Adım Gültepe alongside Ayça Bingöl, Mete Horozoğlu, İlker Kızmaz and Ekin Koç. Her portrayal of the character Nazlı served as a breakthrough in her career. In the 2020 Netflix series "Ethos" ("Bir Başkadır" in Turkish), Önal plays Hayrunnisa, the hodja's daughter, a character who loves her traditional parents, but who also seeks to choose to leave her village to get a college education, likes "foreign" music, and has a relationship with another woman.

Filmography

References

External links 
 
 

1990 births
Living people
Turkish television actresses
Turkish film actresses
Istanbul Bilgi University alumni
Actresses from Istanbul
21st-century Turkish actresses